Recknagel is a surname of:

 Erich Recknagel (1904–1973), German ski jumper 
 Helmut Recknagel (born 1937), German former ski jumper 
 Hermann Recknagel (1892–1945), German general during World War II 
 Alice Recknagel Ireys (1911–2000), American landscape architect 
 John Recknagel (1870-1940), American painter, residing in France

Surnames